Wannsee is a locality in the southwestern Berlin borough of Steglitz-Zehlendorf, Germany. It is the westernmost locality of Berlin. In the quarter there are two lakes, the larger Großer Wannsee (Greater Wannsee, "See" means lake) and the Kleiner Wannsee (Little Wannsee), located on the River Havel and separated only by the Wannsee Bridge.

Geography

Overview
At the western rim of the Wannsee locality the Glienicke Bridge connects it with the city of Potsdam. The late  neoclassical Glienicke Palace as well as the Pfaueninsel are nearby. Since 1990 these palaces and parks have formed part of the Palaces and Parks of Potsdam and Berlin UNESCO World Heritage Site.

The locality is centred on the ancient village of Stolpe, known to exist in 1299. The locality also includes the districts of Kohlhasenbrück (named after the 1811 novella Michael Kohlhaas by Heinrich von Kleist) and Steinstücken, which in Cold War days became famous as a tiny exclave of West Berlin within the GDR.

Großer and Kleiner Wannsee

Wannsee lake is well known as the number-one bathing and recreation spot for western Berlin, especially from a 1951 Schlager hit by teen idol Cornelia Froboess. The Strandbad Wannsee, an open-air lido with one of the longest inland beaches in Europe and a popular nudist area, was built in 1929–1930 after a concept by architect Richard Ermisch. Situated on the eastern shore of the lake it is officially part of the Nikolassee locality.

Subdivision
Wannsee is divided into 5 zones (Ortslagen):
 Am Sandwerder
 Heckeshorn
 Kohlhasenbrück
 Steinstücken
 Stolpe

History

The history of Wannsee as an attractive suburb of Berlin began when "Great Elector" Frederick William of Brandenburg ordered the construction of a hunting lodge, the Jagdschloss Glienicke. The castle remained the hunting lodge of the Hohenzollern family for generations, and was rebuilt and expanded several times. Today, the castle houses an institute for social education.

In 1793, the Prussian king Frederick William II, a descendant of Frederick William, acquired the island Pfaueninsel (German: "Peacock Island") in the Havel river and had the Pfaueninsel castle built for himself and his mistress Wilhelmine Enke in 1794–1797. Jagdschloss Glienicke and Pfaueninsel castle are both part of UNESCO World Heritage Site Palaces and Parks of Potsdam and Berlin.

On 21 November 1811, German writer Heinrich von Kleist shot himself on the shore of the Kleiner Wannsee and, at her bidding, his lover, Henriette Vogel. A memorial marks the site.

Glienicke Palace (German: Schloss Glienicke) was designed in neoclassical style by Karl Friedrich Schinkel for Prince Carl of Prussia in 1826. It used to be the summer palace of the prince. Together with the Russian style ensemble Nikolskoe around the church Ss. Peter and Paul (German: St. Peter und Paul) on the top of a hill on the banks of the Havel river, it also belongs to the UNESCO World Heritage Site Palaces and Parks of Potsdam and Berlin.

Nikolskoe, consisting of the church, a cottage, a school and a cemetery, was established from 1813 to 1837 at the suggestion by the Russian Empress Alexandra Feodorovna, the daughter of King Frederick William III of Prussia. Her brother Prince Carl, constructor of Glienicke Palace, was buried in the church after his death. Today the church is especially popular for weddings and the cottage is housing a restaurant.

The Verein Seglerhaus am Wannsee, the second oldest yacht club in Germany, was established in October 1867 on a small wooden shack by River Havel. In 1877 it moved to its present location at the edge of the lake.

In 1909, Max Liebermann, head of the Berlin Secession, had a villa built at the western shore of the Wannsee. His widow was forced to sell it to the Deutsche Reichspost in 1940. Today, the property is a museum in honor of the painter. Especially worth seeing is the garden, which was a popular Liebermann motif.

In 1928, a large shooting range was established in the Düppel woods near the Berlin city limits. It was the site of the shooting events of the 1936 Summer Olympics. A golf course hosted the running section of the modern pentathlon at the same games. After World War II, it was used by the US Army as the "Rose Range" firing compound. In 1994, the shooting range was returned to Germany by the Allies, and is today used by the DEVA institute.

On 20 January 1942, senior Nazi officials met at the Wannsee Villa (built 1914–1915) to ensure the cooperation of the major government organizations in "the organizational, logistical and material steps for a final solution of the Jewish question in Europe" - the extermination of the Jews of Europe. The event, presided over by Reinhard Heydrich and conducted by Adolf Eichmann, has since become known as the Wannsee Conference. Today, the building serves as a memorial and education centre.

Transport
Wannsee is served by the Berlin S-Bahn lines S1, as terminus, and S7, at the Berlin-Wannsee railway station. It is also a stop of some long-distance trains as well as of RegionalExpress and RegionalBahn trains of Deutsche Bahn and Transdev Germany. Wannsee is also linked to Kladow by Berlin ferry line F10.

Education
The Japanische Internationale Schule zu Berlin, a Japanese international school, is in Wannsee.

People 

 Philipp Franck, painter
 Götz George, actor, childhood in Wannsee
 Otto Erich Hartleben, writer
 Max Liebermann, painter
 Berthold Schenk Graf von Stauffenberg, resistance fighter, Tristanstraße 8–10
 Claus Schenk Graf von Stauffenberg, resistance fighter
 Arthur Scherbius, inventor, lived from 1924–1929 in Wannsee
 Arnold von Siemens (1853-1918), entrepreneur
 Hermann von Siemens (1885-1986), entrepreneur

See also

 Liebermann-Villa
 Isted Lion of Berlin
 Wannsee Conference

References

External links

 1936 Summer Olympics official report. Volume 2. pp. 817–36.
 Special Exhibit – The Residential Villa Areas in Wannsee, 1870 – 1945
 

Localities of Berlin

Venues of the 1936 Summer Olympics
Olympic modern pentathlon venues
Olympic shooting venues